Tournus is a commune in the Saône-et-Loire department in the region of Bourgogne-Franche-Comté in eastern France.

Geography
Tournus is located on the right bank of the Saône, 20 km. northeast of Mâcon on the Paris-Lyon railway.

Population

Sights
The church of St Philibert (early 11th century), is the main surviving building of the former Benedictine abbey of Tournus, suppressed in 1785. It is in the Burgundian Romanesque style. The façade lacks one of the two flanking towers originally designed for it. The nave is roofed with barrel vaulting, supported on tall cylindrical columns. Both the choir and the 11th century crypt beneath it have an ambulatory and side chapels.

In the Place de l'Hôtel de Ville stands a statue of Jean-Baptiste Greuze, born in the town in 1725.

Economy
Tournus is an important tourist area, with one four-star hotel (the Greuze) and one three-star hotel (the Rempart). In 2013, four restaurants had a Michelin star: the Greuze, Quartier Gourmand, Aux Terasses, and Meulien.

There are vineyards in the surrounding district and the town and its port have considerable commerce in wine and in stone from the neighboring quarries. Chairmaking was an important industry.

There are several industrial areas to the north and south-west. The town manufactures a large quantity of domestic white goods, at the Groupe SEB factory, and cookware at the Tefal factory.

There is a market every Saturday morning.

Sport
 On 9 June 2009, the town was the start of the  Stage 3 of the Critérium du Dauphiné Libéré cycle race.
 On 10 July 2010, the town was en route of the  Stage 7  of the Tour de France cycle race.

People
 Birthplace of Jean-Baptiste Greuze (1725–1805), painter.
 Home of Gabriel Voisin (February 5, 1880December 25, 1973), aviation and automobile pioneer.
 Birthplace of Marie-Hélène Mathieu (July 4, 1929), religious worker for the disabled.
 See also: :Category:People from Tournus.

See also
Communes of the Saône-et-Loire department
Lords of Brancion

References

Communes of Saône-et-Loire
Burgundy